

Summer transfer window

August

September

Unknown date

References

Bibliography
 

Italy
Trans
2006